Możanka is a river of Poland. It flows into the Great Olecko Lake, which is drained by the river Lega, near Olecko.

Rivers of Poland
Rivers of Warmian-Masurian Voivodeship